Elenophorini is a tribe of darkling beetles in the subfamily Pimeliinae of the family Tenebrionidae. There are at least three genera in Elenophorini.

Genera
These genera belong to the tribe Elenophorini
 Leptoderis Billberg, 1820  (the Palearctic)
 Megelenophorus Gebien, 1910  (the Neotropics)
 Psammetichus Latreille, 1828  (the Neotropics)

References

Further reading

 
 

Tenebrionoidea